The Asian Football Confederation was allocated two assured qualifying berths for the 1990 FIFA World Cup. 26 teams were in the running for these spots; Bahrain, India, Maldives and South Yemen withdrew without playing a qualifying match.

Asia's two automatic qualifying berths were taken by Korea Republic and the United Arab Emirates.

Format
First round: The Maldives withdrew before the final draw, leaving 25 teams to be divided into 6 groups of 4 or 5 teams each. Nepal was moved from Group 5 to Group 4 after India's withdrawal. The teams played against each other on a home-and-away basis, except in Group 4, where the teams played against each other twice in South Korea and Singapore. The group winners would advance to the final round.
Final round: The 6 teams played against each other once over a 16-day period based in Singapore. The group winner and runner-up would qualify.

First round

Group 1

Qatar advanced to the final round.

Group 2

Saudi Arabia advanced to the final round.

Group 3

United Arab Emirates advanced to the final round.

Group 4

Korea Republic advanced to the final round.

Group 5

China PR advanced to the final round.

Group 6

Korea DPR advanced to the final round.

Final round

Standings

Korea Republic and the United Arab Emirates qualified for the 1990 FIFA World Cup.

Results

Qualified teams
The following two teams from AFC qualified for the final tournament.

1 Bold indicates champions for that year. Italic indicates hosts for that year.

Goalscorers

7 goals

 Hwang Sun-Hong

6 goals

 Ma Lin
 Ahmed Radhi
 Mahmoud Yaseen Al-Soufi

5 goals

 Dollah Salleh

4 goals

 Mai Chao
 Kim Yong-Se
 Darimosuvito Tokijan
 Adnan Al Talyani

3 goals

 Mohsen Garousi
 Farshad Pious
 Chu Gyong-Sik
 Kim Pung-Il
 Hwangbo Kwan
 Noh Soo-Jin
 Nizar Mahrous
 Abdul Razaq Ibrahim

2 goals

 Tang Yaodong
 Wang Baoshan
 Tim Bredbury
 Nang Yan Leung
 Herry Kiswanto
 Karim Bavi
 Hussein Saeed
 Mohamed Al-Diabaz
 Khaled Khalil Awad
 Ali Marwi
 Salah Al-Hasawi
 Han Hyong-Il
 Ri Hyok-chon
 Mansoor Muftah
 Fahad Al-Bishi
 Majed Abdullah
 Mohaisen Al-Jam'an
 Saadoun Al-Suwaiti
 Darimosuvito Devaraj
 Salim Moin
 Ahmad Satter
 Cho Min-Kook
 Choi Sang-Kuk
 Lee Tae-Ho
 Zuhair Bakhit
 Khalid Ismaïl
 Khaleel Mubarak

1 goal

 Mohamed Aslam
 Badal Das
 Wasim Iqbal
 Rumman Bin Wali Sabbir
 Jia Xiuquan
 Liu Haiguang
 Xie Yuxin
 Zhang Xiaowen
 Leslie Santos
 Inyong Lolumbuman
 Mustaqim
 Mustamu Yessy
 Mohammad Hassan Ansarifard
 Sayed Ali Eftekhari
 Sirous Ghayeghran
 Samad Marfavi
 Natiq Hashim
 Habib Jafar
 Ismail Mohammed Sharif
 Kenta Hasegawa
 Takumi Horiike
 Hisashi Kurosaki
 Osamu Maeda
 Takashi Mizunuma
 Katsuyoshi Shinto
 Rateb Al-Dawoud
 Abdulaziz Al-Hajeri
 Fahad Yousef Al-Sovayed
 Kurapiah Gunalan
 Azizol Abu Haniffah
 Lim Teong Kim
 Kim Gwang-Mon
 Tak Yong-Bin
 Yun Jong-Su
 Mohamed Ali Hamoud
 Nasser Khaleefa
 Ali Sharafat
 Saleh Eid Al-Mehaizaa
 Jumah Salem Joher
 Adel Mubarak Khamis
 Mansour Sulaiti
 Fahad Al-Musaibeah
 Ahmed Madani
 Yousuf Al-Thunayan
 Arj Changatamilman
 Tay Peng Kee
 Choi Soon-Ho
 Chung Hae-Won
 Chung Yong-Hwan
 Kim Joo-sung
 Lee Hak-Jong
 Lee Young-Jin
 Park Kyung-Hoon
 Walid Al-Nasser
 Walid Abou El-Sel
 Abdul Latif Helou
 Mohammed Jakalan
 Prasert Changmool
 Piyapong Pue-On
 Abdulaziz Mohamed
 Abdulrahman Mohamed

1 own goal

 Oh Yong-Nam (playing against Japan)

Notes

External links
 Asian Zone at FIFA.com

 
Qual
FIFA World Cup qualification (AFC)
AFC